Jeffrey Skinner is an American poet, writer, playwright, and emeritus professor in the Department of English at the University of Louisville.

His most recent collection of poetry is Salt Water Amnesia, (Ausable Press, 2005). Skinner is editor of two anthologies of poems, Last Call: Poems of Alcoholism, Addiction, and Deliverance; and Passing the Word: Poets and Their Mentors. Skinner's poems have appeared in many literary journals and magazines, including The New Yorker, The Atlantic, The Nation, The American Poetry Review, Poetry, The Georgia Review and The Paris Review.

Four of Skinner's plays have been finalists in the Eugene O'Neill Theater Conference competition, and his one-act, Damned Spot, won the 2006 Paw Paw Village Players short play competition. His recent play Dream On, had its premier full production in February 2007, by the Cardboard Box Collaborative Theatre at Pagent. His new play, Down Range, is in development, and will receive a full production in New York City in the Spring of 2009.

His poems, plays and stories have gathered grants, fellowships, and awards from such sources as the National Endowment for the Arts, the Ingram Merrill Foundation, the Howard Foundation, and the state arts agencies of Connecticut, Delaware, and Kentucky. He has been awarded residencies at Yaddo, The Frost Place, the MacDowell Colony, and the Fine Arts Center in Provincetown. His work has been featured numerous times on National Public Radio. In 2002 Skinner served as Poet-in-Residence at the James Merrill House in Stonington, Connecticut. In 2014, Skinner was awarded a Guggenheim Fellowship in poetry. In 2015, he won an Arts and Letters Award in Literature by the American Academy of Arts and Letters.

Jeffrey Skinner is Chair of the Board of Directors, and Editorial Consultant, for Sarabande Books, a literary publishing house founded by his wife Sarah Gorham.

Published works
 Salt Water Amnesia (Ausable Press, 2005)
 Gender Studies (Miami University Press, 2002)
 The Company of Heaven (University of Pittsburgh Press, 1992)
 A Guide to Forgetting (Graywolf Press, 1987 - a National Poetry Series winner)
 Late Stars (Wesleyan University Press, 1985)

References

Sources
 Sarabande Books Website - About Us - The Sarabandistas!
 Author Website

External links
 Audio: Slate Magazine > Self-made by Jeff Skinner
 Audio: The Writer's Almanac with Garrison Keillor > Modern Maturity by Jeff Skinner
 Sarabande Books Website
 Review of Last Call: Poems on Alcoholism, Addiction, & Deliverance

American male poets
Poets from Kentucky
Writers from Louisville, Kentucky
University of Louisville faculty
Year of birth missing (living people)
Living people
National Endowment for the Arts Fellows